Cesar Chavez Boulevard may refer to:

Cesar Chavez Boulevard (Dallas, Texas), formerly Central Expressway
Cesar Chavez Boulevard (Portland, Oregon), formerly 39th Avenue
Cesar Chavez Boulevard (San Antonio, Texas), east–west throughfare of Downtown San Antonio